Chen Chien-liang is a Taiwanese politician. He was the Deputy Minister of the National Development Council of the Executive Yuan since 22 January 2014.

Education
Chen obtained his bachelor's and master's degree in economics from National Chengchi University in 1987 and 1989 respectively. He then obtained his doctoral degree in economics from University of California, Los Angeles in 1995.

See also
 National Development Council (Republic of China)

References

Living people
Ministers of National Development Council of the Republic of China
National Chengchi University alumni
University of California, Los Angeles alumni
Year of birth missing (living people)